Chris Batstone was the 2000–2002 lead singer of the third-wave ska band, Suburban Legends. He joined the band in 2000 as the replacement for Tim Maurer, who had left the band after the recording of Origin Edition. Batstone's first and only official recording with the band was on their first EP, Suburban Legends, released in 2001. Batstone has credits for co-writing the song 'I Want More', and 'Desperate' found on the EP.

Batstone left the band in early 2002. Reportedly, he became increasingly dissatisfied with the direction the band was taking, and he decided to pursue other musical directions, and an acting career.

He was replaced by Tim Maurer, who re-joined the band in 2002 as the lead singer. The band then re-recorded the vocal tracks on their self-titled EP with Tim to create Suburban Legends (Tim Remix).

Chris Batstone also recorded songs with the band on various compilations. He appears as a vocalist on "All the Nights" from the 'Supporting the Scene' compilation, "Gummi Bears" on 'Because We Care: A Benefit for the Children's Hospital of Orange County' compilation. He produced and performed on Suburban Legend's cover of "Rose Tint My World" (singing along with Aaron Bertram, Dallas Cook, and Vince Walker) on an unreleased tribute album.

Batstone also appears in the video for "I Want More".

Batstone is now a Production Manager for Broadway and National Touring shows.

Filmography

 CSI: Miami Episode 4x14 "Fade Out" & 4x20 "Free Fall" .... Leo, part of a mad criminal couple
 Dunkin' Donuts 2013 Iced Coffee Commercial

External links
The music video for 'I Want More' with Chris Batstone.
 

Living people
American ska singers
American punk rock singers
American male singers
Suburban Legends members
Year of birth missing (living people)